Aoulef District is a district of Adrar Province, Algeria. According to the 2008 census it has a population of 54,909.

Communes

The district is further divided into 4 communes:
Aoulef
Akabli
Timokten
Tit

References

Districts of Adrar Province